The Alexander Pushkin is a 320.65 carat colorless raw diamond, the second largest gem diamond ever found in Russia or the territory of the former Soviet Union (after the 26th Congress of the CPSU), and one of the largest in the world as of 2016. It was mined at the Udachnaya kimberlitic pipe (Yakutia, Far Eastern Federal District) in December 1989 and named after the world-famous Russian writer Alexander Pushkin. It is kept in the Russian Diamond Fund (Moscow Kremlin).

See also 
List of diamonds
List of largest rough diamonds

References 

Cultural depictions of Alexander Pushkin
Diamonds originating in Russia
Diamonds originating in the Soviet Union
Individual diamonds
Diamond Fund